The Lebanese Forces was one of the main Christian factions of the Lebanese Civil War. Originally an umbrella organization for different Christian parties, the Lebanese Forces later became a separate organization. It was mainly staffed by Maronite Christians.

Origins
The Lebanese Front was informally organized in January 1976 under the leadership of Pierre Gemayel and Camille Chamoun. It began as a simple coordination or joint command between the predominantly Christian Kataeb Party/Kataeb Regulatory Forces (KRF), Tyous Team of Commandos (TTC), Ahrar/Tigers Militia, Al-Tanzim, Marada Brigade and Lebanese Renewal Party/Guardians of the Cedars (GoC) parties and their respective military wings. The main reason behind the formation of the Lebanese Front was to strengthen the Christian side against the challenge presented by the Lebanese National Movement (LNM), an umbrella alliance of leftist Muslim parties/militias backed by the Palestine Liberation Organization (PLO) and Rejectionist Front Palestinian guerrilla factions.

The Golden Years (1976-1982)

Christian East Beirut was ringed by heavily fortified Palestinian camps and East Beirut became besieged by the PLO camps. This situation was remedied by the Kataeb Regulatory Forces (most notably the BG Squad that was led by Bachir) and their allied Christian militias as they besieged the Palestinian camps embedded in Christian East Beirut one at a time and brought them down. The first was on 18 January 1976 when the heavily fortified Karantina camp, located near the strategic Beirut Harbor, was invaded: About 1,000 PLO fighters and civilians were killed. The Palestinian PLO and al-Saiqa forces retaliated by attacking the isolated defenseless Christian town of Damour about 20 miles south of Beirut on the coast, during the Damour massacre in which nearly 600 Christian civilians were killed and 15,000 were sent fleeing north by boat, since all roads were blocked off. The Maronites retaliated with the invasion of the largest and strongest Palestinian refugee camp, Tel al-Zaatar that same year. Bachir, with his KRF militia units, also fought against the PLO and LNM militias at the Battle of the Hotels in central Beirut. The most important battle won by the Phalange for the control of the hotel district was the fighting over the possession of the Holiday Inn, due to its important strategic location. Before that battle, the Holiday Inn had been occupied by the PLO.

The Lebanese Forces was soon after established with an agreement that the direct military commander would be a Kataeb member and the vice-commander an Ahrar member.

Bachir led his troops in the infamous Hundred Days War in Lebanon in 1978, in which the Lebanese Forces successfully resisted the Syrian shelling and attacking of Eastern Beirut for about three months before an Arab-brokered agreement forced the Syrians to end the siege. Syrians took high buildings such as Burj Rizk Achrafieh and Burj El Murr using snipers and heavy weapons against civilians. The soldiers stayed for 90 days. Another major clash took place near the Sodeco area in Achrafieh where the Lebanese Forces fought ferociously and drove the Syrian army out of the Rizk Building. At this time, Israel was the primary backer of the Lebanese Front's militia.

In July 1980, following months of intra-Christian clashes between the Tigers, the militia of Dany Chamoun, and the Phalangists, who by now were under the complete leadership of Bachir Gemayel, the Phalangists launched an operation in an attempt to stop the clashes within the Christian areas, and to unite all the Christian militias under Gemayel's command. This operation resulted in a massacre of tens of Tigers' members at the Marine beach resort in Safra, 25 km north of Beirut. Camille Chamoun's silence was interpreted as acceptance of Gemayel's controls, because he felt that the Tigers led by his son were getting out of his control.

In 1981 at Zahlé in the Beqaa, the largest Christian town in the East, confronted one of the biggest battles – both military and political – between the Lebanese Forces and the Syrian occupying forces. The Lebanese Forces was able to confront them even though there was a big mismatch in military capabilities and was able to reverse the result of the battle of 1981. This victory was due to the bravery of the inhabitants and 92 Lebanese Forces soldiers (L.F Special Forces: The Maghaweer) sent from Beirut. The Syrian occupying forces used all kind of weapons (heavy artillery, tanks, war planes...) against the town, and they cut all kind of backup that may come from the Mountain. Regardless of the very bad weather and heavy bombing, convoys were sent in the snow to Zahle. Two Lebanese Forces soldiers died on a hill due to bad weather, they were found later holding each other till they died (Fouad Nammour and George Nakhle). The battle of Zahle gave the Lebanese Cause a new perspective in the International Communities, and the victory was both military and diplomatic. It made the Leadership of President Bashir Gemayel much stronger because of his leadership and important role in this battle. The battle started in April the 2nd 1981, and finished with a cease fire and Lebanese Police were sent to Zahle. The 92 Lebanese Forces heroes returned to Beirut on 1 July 1981.

Israeli invasion
In 1982, Bachir met with Hani Al-Hassan (representative of the PLO) and told him that Israel will enter and wipe them out. Bachir told him to leave Lebanon peacefully before it was too late. Hani left and no reply was given to Bachir.

Israel invaded Lebanon, arguing that a military intervention was necessary in order to root out PLO guerrillas from the southern part of the country. Israeli forces eventually moved towards Beirut and laid siege to the city, aiming to reshape the Lebanese political landscape and force the PLO out of Lebanon. By 1982, Israel had been the main supplier to the Lebanese Forces, giving them assistance in weapons, clothing, and training.

An official Israeli inquiry into the events in Beirut estimated that when it was fully mobilized, the Phalange had 5000 fighters, of which 2000 were full-time.

After the PLO had been expelled from the country and moved its headquarters to Tunisia, in a negotiated agreement, Bachir Gemayel became the youngest man to ever be elected president of Lebanon. He was elected by the parliament in August; most Muslim members of parliament boycotted the vote.

On September 3, 1982, during the meeting, Begin demanded that Bachir sign a peace treaty with Israel as soon as he took office in return for Israel's earlier support of Lebanese Forces and he also told Bachir that the IDF would stay in South Lebanon if the Peace Treaty was not directly signed. Bachir was furious with Begin and told him that the Lebanese Forces did not fight for seven years and he also told Begin that they did not sacrifice thousands of soldiers to free Lebanon from the Syrian Army and the PLO so that Israel could take their place. The meeting ended in rage and both sides were not happy with each other.

Begin was reportedly angry with Bachir for his public denial of Israel's support. Bachir refused to accept the offer of immediate peace by arguing that time was needed to reach a consensus with the Lebanese Muslims and the Arab nations. Bachir was quoted telling David Kimche, the director general of the Israeli Foreign Ministry, a few days earlier, "Please tell your people to be patient. I am committed to make peace with Israel, and I shall do it. But I need time – nine months, maximum one year. I need to mend my fences with the Arab countries, especially with Saudi Arabia, so that Lebanon can once again play its central role in the economy of the Middle East."

In an attempt to fix the relationship between Bachir and Begin, Ariel Sharon held a secret meeting with Bachir in Bikfaya. In this meeting, they both agreed that, after 48 hours, the IDF would cooperate with the Lebanese Army in order to force the Syrian Army out of Lebanon. After that was done, the IDF would peacefully leave Lebanese territory. Concerning the Peace Negotiations, Sharon agreed to give Bachir time to resolve the internal conflicts before signing the negotiations. The next day, Begin's office issued a statement which said that the issues which Bachir and Sharon had agreed upon were accepted.

Nine days before he was to take office, on September 14, 1982, Bachir was killed along with 25 others when a bomb exploded in the Kataeb headquarters in Achrafieh. The attack was carried out by Habib Shartouni, a member of the Syrian Social Nationalist Party (SSNP), believed by many to have acted on instructions of the Syrian government of President Hafez al-Assad. The next day, Israel moved to occupy the city, allowing Phalangist members under Elie Hobeika's command to enter the centrally located Sabra and the Shatila refugee camp; a massacre followed, in which Phalangists killed between 800 and 3,500 (number is disputed) civilians, mostly Palestinians and Lebanese Shiites, causing great international uproar.

Amine Gemayel era (1982–1988)

Battles

Mountain War

After the Israeli invasion, the IDF troops settled in the Chouf and Aley from party militias, the Lebanese Forces returned to the Christian villages which had been occupied by the PSP for seven years, and many Christian civilians from the districts returned after having fled earlier in the war. However, soon after, clashes broke out between the Lebanese Forces and the Druze militias who had now taken over the districts and had earlier kicked out the Christian inhabitants. The main Druze militiamen came from the Progressive Socialist Party, led by Walid Jumblatt, in alliance with the Syrian Army and Palestinian militants who had not departed Lebanon in 1982. For months, the two fought what would later be known as the "Mountain War." At the peak of the battle, Israeli troops infamously abandoned the area, handing the best tactical positions over to the Druze militias and their allies as punishment for the Christians' refusal to sign the May 17 peace agreement with Israel, and leaving the Christian forces to fight.
At the same time, a small number of ill-equipped Lebanese Forces troops also fought battles against the Palestinian and Druze militias and the Syrian troop east of the southern city of Sidon. The outcome was also a Progressive Socialist Party victory and a contiguous Druze Chouf district with access to Lebanese sea ports.

Jumblatt's militia then overstepped itself by advancing further into Souk El Gharb, a village also held by the Lebanese Forces. After fierce battles and severe casualties the attackers were pushed back. However, the Lebanese Forces eventually handed over their positions in Souk El Gharb to the Lebanese army which had great interests in defending the town due to the strategic importance it holds for the army and the Lebanese government as the town lies on the flanks of the Ministry of Defense and the Presidential Palace. After the retreat, the Lebanese Forces freed up more than 2,500 fighters including elite units to fight on other fronts.

Internal power struggles

After the death of Bachir, his brother Amine Gemayel replaced him as president, and his cousin, Fadi Frem as commander of the Lebanese Forces. The two had a frosty relationship, and in 1984, pressure from Amine led to Frem's replacement by Fouad Abou Nader.

On March 12, 1985, Samir Geagea, Elie Hobeika and Karim Pakradouni rebelled against Abou Nader's command, ostensibly to take the Lebanese Forces back to its original path. The relationship between Geagea and Hobeika soon broke down, however, and Hobeika began secret negotiations with the Syrians. On December 28, 1985, he signed the Tripartite Accord, against the wishes of Geagea and most of the other leading Christian figures. Claiming that the Tripartite Accord gave Syria unlimited power in Lebanon, Geagea mobilized factions inside the Lebanese Forces and on January 15, 1986, attacked Hobeika's headquarters in Karantina. Hobeika surrendered and fled, first to Paris and subsequently to Damascus, Syria. He then moved to Zahlé with tens of his fighters where he prepared for an attack against East Beirut. On September 27, 1986, Hobeika's forces tried to take over the Achrafieh neighborhood of Beirut but the Lebanese Forces of Geagea's command held them back.

This failed attempt by Hobeika was the last episode of internal struggles in East Beirut during Amine Gemayel's mandate. As a result, the Lebanese Forces led by Geagea were the only major force on ground. During two years of frail peace, Geagea launched a drive to re-equip and reorganize the Lebanese Forces. He also instituted a social welfare program in areas controlled by Geagea's party. The Lebanese Forces also cut its relations with Israel and emphasized relations with the Arab states, mainly Iraq but also Saudi Arabia, Jordan, and Egypt.

The Elimination War (1988–1990) 

Two rival governments contended for recognition following Amine Gemayel's departure from the Presidency in September 1988, one a mainly Christian government and the other a government of Muslims and Lebanese Leftists. The Lebanese Forces initially supported the military Christian government led by Gen. Michel Aoun, the commander of the Lebanese Army. However, clashes erupted between the Lebanese Forces and the Lebanese Army under the control of Michel Aoun on February 14, 1989.  These clashes were stopped, and after a meeting in Bkerké, the Lebanese Forces handed the national ports which it controlled to Aoun's government under pressure from the Lebanese National Army.

Geagea initially supported Aoun's "Liberation War" against the Syrian army, but then agreed to the Taif Agreement, which was signed by the Lebanese deputies on 24 October 1989 in Saudi Arabia and demanded an immediate ceasefire. Aoun's main objection to the Taif Agreement was its vagueness as to Syrian withdrawal from the country. He rejected it vowing that he "would not sign over the country." Fierce fighting in East Beirut broke out between the two, called the "Elimination War" on January 31, 1990.

Territory Handover to the LAF 

On the 1st April 1990, following an agreement between Geagea and Hrawi, General Elie Hayek (who had been appointed commander of the Mount Lebanon governorate two weeks prior) was mandated by the executive to begin the transfer of military and political administrations in the Christian enclave from the LF to the West Beirut government.  The territories in the Christian North Governorate and East Beirut would still remain under complete LF control, in addition to the 30000 reservist 10000 active men strong militia remain intact for the moment.  In response, Aoun announced that he would not accept any alliance between the two, and transferring the regions of the Metn was thus impossible due to the raging Elimination War.
To further demonstrate his commitment to Taif and willingness to extend civilian administration in “Marounistan”, Geagea placed Hayek's bureau at the LF HQ in Jounieh.

Following the defeat and surrender of Aoun at Baabda on the 13th October 1990, the LAF under Hayek's command began extending its influence South into the Metn and Baabda.
On the 30 April 1991 – final date imposed by the government for the total surrender of weapons and heavy artillery – all LF areas were ceded to the army command for the first time since 1975.

The Second Republic (1990–2005) 
After Aoun surrendered on 13 October 1990 to the rival Syrian-backed President Hrawi, Geagea was offered ministerial posts in the new government. He refused several times, because he was opposed to Syrian interference in Lebanese affairs, and his relationship with the new government deteriorated.
On March 23, 1994, the Lebanese government headed by Rafic Hariri ordered the dissolution of the LF. On April 21, 1994, Geagea was arrested on charges of setting a bomb in a church at Zouk Mikael, of instigating acts of violence, and of committing assassinations during the Lebanese Civil War. Although he was acquitted of the first charge, Geagea was subsequently arrested and sentenced to life imprisonment on several different counts, including the assassination of former Prime Minister Rashid Karami in 1987. He was incarcerated in solitary confinement, with his access to the outside world severely restricted. Amnesty International criticized the conduct of the trials and demanded Geagea's release, and Geagea's supporters argued that the Syrian-controlled Lebanese government had used the alleged crimes as a pretext for jailing Geagea and banning an anti-Syrian party.
Many members of the Lebanese Forces were arrested and brutally tortured in the period of 1993–1994. At least one died in Syrian custody and many others were severely injured.

Military structure

Command

Initially allocated at the Kataeb Party's offices in Achrafieh, the LF Headquarters was relocated in August 1976 by Bashir Gemayel to an abandoned hospital at the Karantina neighborhood located east of the Port of Beirut, where it stayed until 1986, before being moved to its final location at the coastal town of Amsheet.

Early field organization 1977-1985

By the early 1980s, the LF command had built up a force of some 15,000 well-armed militiamen, and claimed that they could mobilize a total Christian army of 40,000, complete with Israeli-supplied tanks and artillery.

Late war and post-war field organization 1986-1994

LF ground forces' strength by the late 1980s peaked at 14,500 full-time regulars (although other sources list a slightly higher number, about 15,000) and 30,000 part-time reservists, totalling 44,500 men and women equipped with an impressive, disparate arsenal of 100 tanks, 200 APCs and 150 artillery pieces of various types.

Branches of Service
The LF was structured along conventional lines, comprising several branches of service and support units, most of them inherited from the old Kataeb Regulatory Forces. Specialized technical services consisted of:

Infantry Corps (Arabic: Silah al-Moushat)
Armoured Corps (Arabic: Silah al-Moudara'a)
Tank Corps (Arabic: Fourousiya)
Artillery Corps (Arabic: Silah al-Madfa'aiya) – the LF artillery branch, formed in 1977.
Signal Corps (Arabic: Silah al-Ichara)
Naval Units (Arabic: Silah al-Bahriya) – the LF naval service, established in 1978, being employed as a shock force for military operations and equipped with over a dozen sea crafts of various types.
Women Corps (Arabic: Nizamyyat)
Military Engineering Corps (Arabic: Handassa Askariya or Silah al-Handassa) – the LF engineering branch, formed in 1981.
Logistics Corps (Arabic: Daeem)
Rescue Service (Arabic: Wahadat al-Isa'af) – the LF medical support and casualty evacuation unit, established in 1981.
Military Police (Arabic: Shorta al-A'askariya) – the LF regular provost corps, created in 1980 out of the earlier SKS security companies of the Kataeb Regulatory Forces. They wore a red left sleeve brassard with white MP letters and a red circumferential band around their helmets with white MP letters superimposed on the front. Military policemen also wore white pistol belts and holsters.

Elite units
Snow Units (Arabic: Silah al-Tazalouj) – the LF Mountain troops' corps, specialized in Mountain warfare.
LF Marines – an Israeli-trained naval infantry unit specialized in seaborne infiltration, naval infantry and reconnaissance (Ranger) operations. The Marines also operated in conjunction with the LF Naval Service over a dozen small watercraft. They wore light blue berets.
Force Sadem ('Strike Force') – a hand-picked company-sized commando, one of the few units in the region capable of conducting sea air land operations unit known for their ruthlessness and ability. Was the best trained and most elite unit in the war. Was known for their hard training, like the 40 days of hell were they were forced to live out of nature for 40 days without water and food. They were trained by a US army green beret. And participated in training by the US, Britain, France, and Jordan. At the beginning in 1986 they consisted of 11 men, then they tried to expand the unit, thousands of men participated in the training, they only managed to expand it to 30/40 men. Wore a red beret.
101st Parachute Unit or 101st Parachute Company (Arabic: Wahadat al-Mazaliyin) – a company-sized airborne-qualified Ranger unit formed in 1984, whose members underwent jump-training in Israel and the United States.
Special Force Unit 77 (Arabic: Wahdat al-Quwwat al-Khasat Sabeat wa Sabeun) or Battalion 77 (Arabic: Katibat Sabeat wa Sabein) – a battalion-sized light infantry unit formed in 1982–1984.
Defense Brigade (Arabic: Liwa al-Difa'a) – regimental-sized mechanized infantry unit set up in 1990, which consisted of the 61st, 62nd and 63rd battalions. The brigade was never brought to strength, since only the former two battalions were constituted and the third one was not even raised prior to the unit's disbandement in 1991.
Commandos (Arabic: al-Maghaweer) – several conventionally-structured special operations units existed.
Itbaani or Itbaeni – Commando unit specialized in anti-tank warfare and anti-aircraft defense.
LF Frogmen – Combat Swimmer Unit and Maritime Special Operations Force attached to the LF marines, which consisted of 100 men and modelled after the US Navy SEALs.
Damouri Brigade (Arabic: Liwa' al-Dumuri) – battalion-sized infantry unit, created in October 1980 from former Tigers Militia fighters.
Force 75 – Brigade-sized personal militia of Amine Gemayel.

Intelligence and security

Civil Police (Arabic: Shorta al-Madaniyya)
Security Agency (Arabic: Jihaz al-Aman) – the LF counter-espionnage and military intelligence service, established in 1978.

List of LF supreme commanders

Bachir Gemayel (1976-1982) 
Fadi Frem (1982-1984) 
Fouad Abou Nader (1984-1985)
Elie Hobeika (1985-1986)
Samir Geagea (1986-1994)

LF chiefs-of-staff
George Freiha – Chief-of-Staff to Bashir Gemayel.
Fadi Frem
General Fouad Malek (1987-1994)

LF junior commanders
Alex Mteini
Antoine Bridi
Assaad Chaftari – LF intelligence chief.
Abdeh Raji (a.k.a. 'Captain')
Biar Rizq (a.k.a. 'Akram') 
Boutros Khawand
Elias Khoury
Elie Zayek
Hanna Atik (a.k.a. 'Hanoun')
Kayrouz Baraket – Commander of the LF Special Forces.
Joseph Eddeh (a.k.a. 'Joe' Eddeh)
Joseph Elias
Jocelyne Khoueiry – Commander of the LF Women Corps.
Massoud Achkar (a.k.a. 'Poussy' Achkar) – Field Commander of the LF in Achrafieh, Beirut.
Nader Succar
Naji Butrus – Field Commander of the LF in Ain El Remmaneh, Beirut.
Raymond Assayan
Robert Hatem (a.k.a. 'Cobra')
Sami Khoueiry – Commander of Force 75.
Salim Meayki – Head of the LF Civil Police and Director of the LF military academy, the Bashir Gemayel Institute.
Sleiman Sawaya
Suhail Menassa
Paul Andari – LF Deputy Field Commander of the Mountain District.
Paul Gemayel
Ibrahim Daher
Ibrahim Haddad

Training facilities

Military Academy
To train LF officer cadets, a Military Academy, later renamed the Bashir Gemayel Institute (Arabic: Maehad Bashir Gemayel), was set up in 1985 at a disused Maronite monastery in the town of Ghosta, located 20 km east of Beirut in the Keserwan District.

Weapons and equipment
The Lebanese Forces were financed, trained and armed mainly by Israel, though they also received covert military support from France, the United States, United Kingdom, South Africa, Jordan and Iraq. In addition to aid from the Israelis, the LF purchased a large part of their military supplies on the international black market, and also made use of captured stocks from the Palestine Liberation Organization (PLO), the Syrian Army and even the Lebanese Army.

Infantry weapons

Lebanese Forces's militiamen were provided with a variety of small-arms, comprising M1 Garand (or its Italian-produced copy, the Beretta Model 1952) and SKS semi-automatic rifles, plus MAT-49, Škorpion vz. 61, Carl Gustaf m/45 (or its Egyptian-produced version, dubbed the "Port Said"), Walther MPL, Sterling L2A3/Mark 4, Spectre M4, Uzi (MP-2, Mini Uzi and Micro Uzi variants), MAC-10, MAC-11 (sub-compact version of the MAC-10), Heckler & Koch MP5 and Heckler & Koch MP5K (shortened version of the MP5) submachine guns.

Several models of assault rifles were employed, such as M16A1, FN FAL (variants included the Israeli-produced 'lightened' ROMAT), Heckler & Koch G3, Vz. 58, AK-47 and AKM (other variants included the Zastava M70, Chinese Type 56, Romanian Pistol Mitralieră model 1963/1965, Bulgarian AKK/AKKS and former East German MPi-KMS-72 assault rifles). Limited quantities of the AMD-65, CAR-15 and SIG SG 543 carbines, M16A2, SIG SG 542, FN CAL, Heckler & Koch HK33, Heckler & Koch G41, Heckler & Koch G53 and ArmaLite AR-18 assault rifles were also acquired, being mostly employed by LF elite commando units on special operations. 
Inevitably, this variety of assault rifles and carbines of different calibres within LF combat units naturally caused logistic 
difficulties to the LF's supply corps, so the LF Command decided after 1986 to simplify its small-arms inventory by standardizing on the FN FAL, M16A1, and AKM assault rifles for its infantry units, though this still posed problems in providing ammunition and replacement parts up to the end of the War.

Shotguns consisted of Mossberg 500 12-gauge (20.2mm), Remington Model 870 Police Magnum 12-gauge (20.2mm) and Franchi SPAS-12 semi-automatic models. Sniper rifles were commonly used, and models included the Dragunov SVD-63, Tabuk, M21, Remington Model 700, Savage 10FP/110FP, Enfield L42A1 (military version) and Enforcer (Police version) rifles, and the Heckler & Koch PSG1.

A wide variety of handguns' models were used, including Smith & Wesson Model 10, Smith & Wesson Model 13, Smith & Wesson Model 14, Smith & Wesson Model 15, Smith & Wesson Model 17 and Smith & Wesson Model 19 revolvers, Mauser M2 semi-automatic handguns, Walther PPK pistols, Heckler & Koch VP 70, Heckler & Koch P7 and Heckler & Koch P9 pistols, SIG P210, SIG-Sauer P220 and SIG-Sauer P225 pistols, Astra A-80, Astra A-90 and Astra A-100 pistols, Llama M82 pistols, Star 30M, and Star A, B, B Super and P pistols, Star Ultrastar, Star Firestar and Star Megastar pistols, Taurus PT92, PT99 and PT100 pistols, Beretta M1951 pistols, MAB PA-15 pistols, Colt M1911A1 Semi-Automatic Pistols, Para-Ordnance P14-45 (Canadian-produced version of the M1911A1 pistol), FN Browning Hi-Power pistols, FN Browning BDM pistols, FN Browning BDA380 pistols, FN Browning HP-DA/BDA9 pistols, Tokarev TT-33 pistols, Makarov PM/PMM pistols, and CZ 52, CZ 75, CZ 82/83 and CZ 85 pistols.

Squad weapons consisted of Rheinmetall MG 3, Heckler & Koch HK21, AA-52, RPK, RPD, PK/PKM, M60 and FN MAG light machine guns, with heavier Browning M1919A4 .30 Cal, Browning M2HB .50 Cal, SG-43/SGM Goryunov and DShKM machine guns being employed as platoon and company weapons.

Grenade launchers and portable anti-tank weapons were also widely employed, including M203 grenade launchers, CMS B-300 83mm, M72 LAW, RPG-7 and M47 Dragon anti-tank rocket launchers. Anti-tank guided missile systems comprised the MILAN (75 missiles and nine launchers were allegedly obtained via South Africa), the BGM-71 TOW (seized from Lebanese Army stocks) and the AT-3 Sagger. Crew-served and indirect fire weapons included M224 60mm, M29 81mm, Type E1 51mm and 2B14-1 Podnos 82mm light mortars, plus M2 Carl Gustaf 84mm, SPG-9 73mm,  B-10 82mm, B-11 107mm and M40A1 106mm recoilless rifles (often mounted on technicals).

Armoured vehicles
The Lebanese Forces' early armoured corps in 1977 inherited a motley collection of captured light tanks, Charioteer tanks, M42A1 Duster SPAAGs, APCs, and some models of homebuilt armoured cars from the old Kataeb Regulatory Forces or handed over by the other, recently incorporated Christian factions.  Thanks to the steady influx of Israeli aid, it grew from a small battalion to a powerful armoured corps by June 1982, capable of aligning some forty M50 Super Sherman medium tanks, twenty-two Ti-67 TIRAN (Israeli-modified T-54/55s) MBTs (other sources list a total of either thirty-six or forty Ti-67s on the LF inventory), M3/M9 Zahlam half-tracks, M113 and BTR-152 APCs. In addition, twenty T-54/55 tanks were later captured from the Syrian Army in the course of the 1982 Lebanon War, being repaired and subsequently taken into LF service. Following the PLO's withdrawal from west Beirut in October 1982, the LF salvaged seven UR-416 armoured cars left behind by the departing Palestinian forces, from which one vehicle was later captured by the Popular Nasserist Organization (PNO) militia during the battle for the Sidon bridgehead in 1985.

The collapse of the Lebanese Army's 4th Infantry Brigade in February 1984 allowed the LF to make up for their own losses incurred in the 1983-84 Mountain War by seizing seven M48A5 MBTs, five AMX-13 light tanks, twelve Panhard AML-90 armoured cars, and some M113 APCs. Later in the war, sixty-four T-54A, T-55A and T-62 tanks, along with fifty M113 APCs modified as mortar carriers  (captured from the Islamic Republic of Iran Army during the Iran-Iraq War) and eighteen BTR-60PB (8x8) APCs were received from Iraq via Jordan in 1986–89; a few M577 command vehicles, AMX-VCI and Panhard M3 VTT armoured personnel carriers were also seized from the Lebanese Army in 1990. The LF also fielded three Soviet-built ZSU-23-4M1 Shilka SPAAGs captured from the PLO in West Beirut early in 1982, which they employed in their battles for control of east Beirut during the Elimination War in January–October 1990.

Transport, liaison and recovery vehicles
Besides tracked and wheeled AFVs, the LF also relied on a wide range of softskin, all-terrain military and 'militarized' civilian vehicles for both troop and supply transport. Like many other Lebanese militias, the LF continued to field a sizable force of gun trucks and technicals armed with Heavy Machine-guns, recoilless rifles, Anti-Aircraft autocannons, anti-tank rockets and light MBRLs. The light vehicles employed in this role included Soviet UAZ-469, US M151A1/A2 jeeps, US Willys M38A1 MD and South Korean Kia KM410 and Keohwa M-5GA1 jeeps, to Land Rover Series II-III, Santana Series III (Spanish-produced version of the Land-Rover series III), Morattab Series IV (Iranian-produced unlicensed version of the Land-Rover long wheelbase series III), Toyota Land Cruiser (J40/J42), Chevrolet C-10/C-15 Cheyenne and Chevrolet C-20 Scottsdale light pickup trucks, Dodge D series (3rd generation) and Dodge Power Wagon W200 pickup trucks, Israeli-produced AIL M325 Command Cars ('Nun-Nun') and Mercedes-Benz Unimog 406 and 416 light trucks (captured from the PLO in 1982).

For logistical support, pickups and light, medium and heavy transportation trucks were employed, mostly Toyota Land Cruiser (J42) hardtop, Toyota Land Cruiser (J45), Toyota Land Cruiser (J70) hardtop, AIL M325, M880/M890 Series CUCV, Chevrolet C-20, and Datsun 620 Custom 1976 pickup trucks, Unimog light trucks, GAZ-66, Chevrolet C-50 medium-duty, Dodge F600 medium-duty and GMC C4500 medium-duty trucks, and GMC C7500 heavy-duty cargo trucks, US M35A1/A2 2½-ton (6x6) military trucks, M813 5-ton (6x6) cargo trucks and Faun L912/21-MUN heavy cargo trucks. In addition, AIL M325 ambulance version cars, Chevrolet/GMC G-Series third generation vans, Volkswagen Type 2 Transporter minibuses and Nissan Patrol 160-Series (3rd generation) 5-door wagon/vans were used as military ambulances. The Israelis also provided to the LF a number of M88A1 medium recovery vehicles, which served alongside some M578 light recovery vehicles seized from the Lebanese Army and captured VT-55KS Armoured Recovery Vehicles from the Syrian Army. Ratrack dual track snow coaches were employed by the LF in the snowy environment of Mount Lebanon mountains. The LF fielded three ex-US Army XM523E2 Heavy Equipment Transporters (HET) to transport its medium tanks and MBTs.

Artillery

The LF also fielded an impressive artillery corps. Starting with some British QF Mk III 25-Pounder field guns seized from the Government Forces, they received four French DEFA D921/GT-2 90mm anti-tank guns (mounted on M3/M9 half tracks), ZiS-3 76.2mm anti-tank guns (mounted on GAZ-66 trucks) and BF-50 (M-50) 155mm Howitzers and M-30 122mm (M-1938) Howitzers from the Israelis, followed in the 1980s by D-44 85mm anti-tank guns, M-46 130mm (M-1954), Type 59-1 130mm (a Chinese-made gun derivered from the Soviet M-46), eighteen BS-3 100mm (M-1944), eighteen D-30 122mm (some re-mounted on turretless T-54 tanks) and D-20 152mm Howitzers of Soviet origin supplied by Israel, Jordan and Iraq. A number of FH-70 155mm Howitzers were also seized from the Lebanese Army in February 1984.

The two latter Countries also provided to the LF substantial quantities of Multi-Barrel Rocket Launchers (MBRLs), notably the BM-21 Grad 122mm system mounted on Russian Ural-375D (6x6) military trucks (of which eighteen were delivered by Iraq); such MBRLs could also be found installed on the back of Mercedes-Benz Unimog 406 (4x4) light trucks.  The LF also employed Chinese versions (Types 63 and 81) of the towed BM-12 107mm and BM-14 140mm MBRLs captured from the PLO in 1982 (with some being re-installed on the rear tray of South Korean Keohwa M-5GA1 Jeeps, Israeli-made 'Nun-Nun' Command cars, and on turretless T-54 tanks) as well as Iraqi-supplied Romanian APR-40/Yugoslav RO-40 128mm systems mounted on DAC-665T (6x6) trucks. Iraq also provided a small number of Frog-7 short-range artillery rockets mounted on wheeled 9P113 transporter erector launchers (TEL).

These same countries also gave the LF limited quantities of heavy mortars, such as the Israeli-made Soltam M-65 120mm and M-66 160mm heavy mortars mounted on ex-IDF half-tracks and modified M113 APCs, and even received from Iraq in 1988 three Soviet 2S4 240mm towed breech-loading heavy mortars, to which were added one or two Chinese-manufactured 240mm mortars the LF had captured in 1982 following the Israeli invasion.

Soviet KPV 14.5mm, ZPU (ZPU-1, ZPU-2, ZPU-4) 14.5mm and ZU-23-2 23mm AA autocannons, British Bofors 40mm L/60 anti-aircraft guns and Soviet AZP S-60 57mm anti-aircraft guns (mostly mounted on technicals, M113 and BTR-152 APCs and M3/M9 half-tracks) were employed in both air defense and direct fire supporting roles. Man-portable, shoulder-launched Soviet SA-7 Grail surface-to-air missiles (SAM) were also used by the LF, possibly obtained from Iraq.

Sea craft
Apart from its ground forces, the LF maintained a naval branch equipped with over a dozen sea crafts of various types. The inventory comprized two British-made Fairey Marine Tracker MkII Class patrol boats previously seized from the Lebanese Navy in January 1980, two Israeli-made Dvora-class fast patrol boats and five Dabur-1 class patrol boats acquired via the Mossad that same year and eight French-made Zodiac rubber inflatable boats, plus an unspecified number of converted civilian fishing crafts armed with Heavy machine-guns and RPG-7s.

Aircraft
In the late 1980s, the LF Command made plans to raise an air wing equipped mainly with light attack helicopters. Several student pilots were sent to Iraq and other countries to attend helicopter pilot courses, and later on the LF received from Iraq three Aérospatiale SA 342L Gazelle helicopter gunships. The program was eventually interrupted, then canceled when the Elimination War broke out in January 1990. It is not clear if any of the Gazelles were actually delivered by the Iraqis prior to the end of the civil war in October 1990, although it has been reported that the LF illegally sold three helicopters of this same type to Serbia in 1991.

See also 

Al-Tanzim
Bashir Gemayel
Battle of Zahleh
East Beirut canton
Ehden massacre
Guardians of the Cedars
Hundred Days' War
Kataeb Party
Kataeb Regulatory Forces
January 1986 Lebanese Forces coup
Lebanese Civil War
Lebanese Front
Lebanese Forces – Executive Command
Lebanese National Movement
Lebanese Youth Movement (MKG)
List of weapons of the Lebanese Civil War
Marada Brigade
Mountain War
Sabra and Shatila massacre
Tigers Militia
Tyous Team of Commandos
People's Liberation Army (Lebanon)
Young Men (Lebanon)
Zahliote Group
4th Infantry Brigade (Lebanon)
9th Infantry Brigade (Lebanon)
1982 kidnapping of Iranian diplomats

Notes 

أحزاب سياسية في لبنان

References

 Alain Menargues, Les Secrets de la guerre du Liban: Du coup d'état de Béchir Gémayel aux massacres des camps palestiniens, Albin Michel, Paris 2004.  (in French)
 Antoine J. Abraham, The Lebanon war, Greenwood Publishing Group 1996. , 9780275953898.
Barry Rubin (editor), Lebanon: Liberation, Conflict, and Crisis, Middle East in Focus, Palgrave Macmillan, London 2009.  – 
 Claire Hoy and Victor Ostrovsky, By Way of Deception: The Making and Unmaking of a Mossad Officer, St. Martin's Press, New York 1990. 
 Denise Ammoun, Histoire du Liban contemporain: Tome 2 1943-1990, Éditions Fayard, Paris 2005.  (in French) – 
 Edgar O'Ballance, Civil War in Lebanon, 1975-92, Palgrave Macmillan, London 1998. 
 Éric Micheletti and Yves Debay, Liban – dix jours aux cœur des combats, RAIDS magazine n.º41, October 1989 issue.  (in French)
 Fawwaz Traboulsi, Identités et solidarités croisées dans les conflits du Liban contemporain; Chapitre 12: L'économie politique des milices: le phénomène mafieux, Thèse de Doctorat d'Histoire – 1993, Université de Paris VIII, 2007. (in French) – 
 Fawwaz Traboulsi, A History of Modern Lebanon: Second Edition, Pluto Press, London 2012. 
 Hazem Saghieh, Ta'rib al-Kata'eb al-Lubnaniyya: al-Hizb, al-sulta, al-khawf, Beirut: Dar al-Jadid, 1991. (in Arabic).
 Lewis W. Snider, The Lebanese Forces: their origins and role in Lebanon's politics, Middle East Journal, Vol. 38, No. 1 (Winter 1984). – 
 Jago Salmon, Massacre and Mutilation: Understanding the Lebanese Forces through their use of violence, Workshop on the 'techniques of Violence in Civil War', PRIO, Oslo, August 20–21, 2004. – 
 Jean Sarkis, Histoire de la guerre du Liban, Presses Universitaires de France – PUF, Paris 1993.  (in French)
 Jennifer Philippa Eggert, Female Fighters and Militants During the Lebanese Civil War: Individual Profiles, Pathways, and Motivations, Studies in Conflict & Terrorism, Taylor & Francis Group, LLC, 2018. –  
 John Laffin, The War of Desperation: Lebanon 1982-85, Osprey Publishing Ltd, London 1985. 
 Jonathan Randall, The Tragedy of Lebanon: Christian Warlords, Israeli Adventurers, and American Bunglers, Just World Books, Charlottesville, Virginia 2012. 
 Makram Rabah, Conflict on Mount Lebanon: The Druze, the Maronites and Collective Memory, Alternative Histories, Edinburgh University Press, 2020 (1st edition). 
 Marius Deeb, The Lebanese Civil War, Praeger Publishers Inc., New York 1980. 
 Matthew S. Gordon, The Gemayels (World Leaders Past & Present), Chelsea House Publishers, 1988. 
 Nader Moumneh, The Lebanese Forces: Emergence and Transformation of the Christian Resistance, Hamilton Books, London 2019.  – 
 Paul Jureidini, R. D. McLaurin, and James Price, Military operations in selected Lebanese built-up areas, 1975-1978, Aberdeen, MD: U.S. Army Human Engineering Laboratory, Aberdeen Proving Ground, Technical Memorandum 11–79, June 1979.
 Rex Brynen, Sanctuary and Survival: the PLO in Lebanon, Boulder: Westview Press, Oxford 1990.  – 
Robert Fisk, Pity the Nation: Lebanon at War, London: Oxford University Press, (3rd ed. 2001).  – 
 Samir Kassir, La Guerre du Liban: De la dissension nationale au conflit régional, Éditions Karthala/CERMOC, Paris 1994.  (in French)
 Samuel M. Katz, Lee E. Russel, and Ron Volstad, Armies in Lebanon 1982-84, Men-at-arms series 165, Osprey Publishing Ltd, London 1985. 
 Samuel M. Katz and Ron Volstad, Arab Armies of the Middle East Wars 2, Men-at-arms series 194, Osprey Publishing Ltd, London 1988. 
 William W. Harris, Faces of Lebanon: Sects, Wars, and Global Extensions, Princeton Series on the Middle East, Markus Wiener Publishers, Princeton 1997. , 1-55876-115-2

Secondary sources
Anthony Tucker-Jones, Images of War: T–54/55, The Soviet Army’s Cold War main battle tank – rare photographs from wartime archives, Pen & Sword Military, Barnsley 2017. 
Gordon L. Rottman, US Grenade Launchers – M79, M203, and M320, Weapon series 57, Osprey Publishing Ltd, Oxford 2017. 
Leroy Thompson, The G3 Battle Rifle, Weapon series 68, Osprey Publishing Ltd, Oxford 2019. 
Leigh Neville, Technicals: Non-Standard Tactical Vehicles from the Great Toyota War to modern Special Forces, New Vanguard series 257, Osprey Publishing Ltd, Oxford 2018. 
Moustafa El-Assad, Blue Steel 2: M-3 Halftracks in South Lebanon, Blue Steel books, Sidon 2006. 
Moustafa El-Assad, Blue Steel III: M-113 Carriers in South Lebanon, Blue Steel books, Sidon 2007. 
Moustafa El-Assad, Blue Steel IV: M-50 Shermans and M-50 APCs in South Lebanon, Blue Steel books, Sidon 2007. 
 Moustafa El-Assad, Civil Wars Volume 1: The Gun Trucks, Blue Steel books, Sidon 2008. 
James Kinnear, Stephen Sewell & Andrey Aksenov, Soviet T-54 Main Battle Tank, General Military series, Osprey Publishing Ltd, Oxford 2018. 
James Kinnear, Stephen Sewell & Andrey Aksenov, Soviet T-55 Main Battle Tank, General Military series, Osprey Publishing Ltd, Oxford 2019. 
 Samer Kassis, 30 Years of Military Vehicles in Lebanon, Beirut: Elite Group, 2003.  – 
 Samer Kassis, Véhicules Militaires au Liban/Military Vehicles in Lebanon 1975-1981, Trebia Publishing, Chyah 2012. 
 Samer Kassis, Les TIRAN 4 et 5, de Tsahal aux Milices Chrétiennes (1960-1990), Trucks & Tanks Magazine n.º 50, July–August 2015, pp. 54–61.  (in French)
Samer Kassis, Tiran in Lebanese Wars (Ammo_A.MIG-6000), AMMO of Mig Jimenez S.L., 2018. 
 Samer Kassis, Invasion of Lebanon 1982, Abteilung 502, 2019.  – 
 Samuel M. Katz and Ron Volstad, Battleground Lebanon (1003), Concord Publications, Hong Kong 1990. 
 Steven J. Zaloga, Tank battles of the Mid-East Wars (2): The wars of 1973 to the present, Concord Publications, Hong Kong 2003.  – 
 Steven J. Zaloga, ZSU-23-4 Shilka & Soviet Air Defense Gun Vehicles, Concord Publications, Hong Kong 1993. 
Zachary Sex & Bassel Abi-Chahine, Modern Conflicts 2 – The Lebanese Civil War, From 1975 to 1991 and Beyond, Modern Conflicts Profile Guide Volume II, AK Interactive, 2021. ISBN 8435568306073

External links
 Lebanese Forces official site
 The Lebanese Phalanges – Kataeb
 Bachir Gemayel Squad Website
 Lebanese Forces camouflage patterns
Lebanese Forces vehicles in the Lebanese civil war
Histoire militaire de l'armée libanaise de 1975 à 1990 (in French)

Factions in the Lebanese Civil War
Lebanese factions allied with Israel
Lebanese Front